Corporal James Albert Barber (July 11, 1841 – June 26, 1925) was an American soldier who fought in the American Civil War. Barber was awarded the country's highest award for bravery during combat, the Medal of Honor, for his action at Petersburg, Virginia in April 1865. He was presented with the award on June 20, 1866.

Biography
Barber enlisted as an artillery man in the First Rhode Island Light Artillery on November 11, 1861 at age 20. He was among a twenty-member detachment of his company, Battery G., along with an infantry assaulting party, that captured enemy weapons and assaulted enemy forces, on 2 April 1865.

Medal of Honor citation

See also

List of American Civil War Medal of Honor recipients: A–F

References

1841 births
1925 deaths
People of Rhode Island in the American Civil War
Union Army soldiers
United States Army Medal of Honor recipients
American Civil War recipients of the Medal of Honor